Equivalent dose is a dose quantity  H  representing the stochastic health effects of low levels of ionizing radiation on the human body which represents the probability of radiation-induced cancer and genetic damage. It is derived from the physical quantity absorbed dose, but also takes into account the biological effectiveness of the radiation, which is dependent on the radiation type and energy. In the SI system of units, the unit of measure is the sievert (Sv).

Application

To enable consideration of stochastic health risk, calculations are performed to convert the physical quantity absorbed dose into equivalent dose, the details of which depend on the radiation type. For applications in radiation protection and dosimetry assessment, the International Commission on Radiological Protection (ICRP) and the International Commission on Radiation Units and Measurements (ICRU) have published recommendations and data on how to calculate equivalent dose from absorbed dose.

Equivalent dose is designated by the ICRP as a "limiting quantity"; to specify exposure limits to ensure that "the occurrence of stochastic health effects is kept below unacceptable levels and that tissue reactions are avoided". This is a calculated value, as equivalent dose cannot be practically measured, and the purpose of the calculation is to generate a value of equivalent dose for comparison with observed health effects.

Calculation

Equivalent dose HT is calculated using the mean absorbed dose deposited in body tissue or organ T, multiplied by the radiation weighting factor WR which is dependent on the type and energy of the radiation R.

The radiation weighting factor represents the relative biological effectiveness of the radiation and modifies the absorbed dose to take account of the different biological effects of various types and energies of radiation.

The ICRP has assigned radiation weighting factors to specified radiation types dependent on their relative biological effectiveness, which are shown in accompanying table.

Calculating equivalent dose from absorbed dose;

where
HT  is the equivalent dose in sieverts (Sv) absorbed by tissue T,
DT,R  is the absorbed dose in grays (Gy) in tissue T by radiation type R and
WR  is the radiation weighting factor defined by regulation.
Thus for example, an absorbed dose of 1 Gy by alpha particles will lead to an equivalent dose of 20 Sv, and an equivalent dose of radiation is estimated to have the same biological effect as an equal amount of absorbed dose of gamma rays, which is given a weighting factor of 1.

To obtain the equivalent dose for a mix of radiation types and energies, a sum is taken over all types of radiation energy doses. This takes into account the contributions of the varying biological effect of different radiation types.

History
The concept of equivalent dose was developed in the 1950s. In its 1990 recommendations, the ICRP revised the definitions of some radiation protection quantities, and provided new names for the revised quantities. Some regulators, notably the International Committee for Weights and Measures (CIPM) and the US Nuclear Regulatory Commission continue to use the old terminology of quality factors and dose equivalent, even though the underlying calculations have changed.

Future use  
At the ICRP 3rd International Symposium on the System of Radiological Protection in October 2015, ICRP Task Group 79 reported on the "Use of Effective Dose as a Risk-related Radiological Protection Quantity".

This included a proposal to discontinue use of equivalent dose as a separate protection quantity. This would avoid confusion between equivalent dose, effective dose and dose equivalent, and to use absorbed dose in Gy as a more appropriate quantity for limiting deterministic effects to the eye lens, skin, hands & feet.

These proposals will need to go through the following stages:

 Discussion within ICRP Committees
 Revision of report by Task Group
 Reconsideration by Committees and Main Commission
 Public Consultation

Units
The SI unit of measure for equivalent dose is the sievert, defined as one Joule per kg. In the United States the roentgen equivalent man (rem), equal to 0.01 sievert, is still in common use, although regulatory and advisory bodies are encouraging transition to sieverts.

Related quantities

Limitation of equivalent dose calculation
Equivalent dose HT is used for assessing stochastic health risk due to external radiation fields that penetrate uniformly through the whole body. However it needs further corrections when the field is applied only to part(s) of the body, or non-uniformly to measure the overall stochastic health risk to the body. To enable this a further dose quantity called effective dose must be used to take into account the varying sensitivity of different organs and tissues to radiation.

Relationship to committed dose
Whilst equivalent dose is used for the stochastic effects of external radiation, a similar approach is used for internal, or committed dose. The ICRP defines an equivalent dose quantity for individual committed dose, which is used to measure the effect of inhaled or ingested radioactive materials. A committed dose from an internal source represents the same effective risk as the same amount of equivalent dose applied uniformly to the whole body from an external source.

Committed equivalent dose, H T(t) is the time integral of the equivalent dose rate in a particular tissue or organ that will be received by an individual following intake of radioactive material into the body by a Reference Person, where s is the integration time in years.
This refers specifically to the dose in a specific tissue or organ, in the similar way to external equivalent dose.

The ICRP states "Radionuclides incorporated in the human body irradiate the tissues over time periods determined by their physical half-life and their biological retention within the body. Thus they may give rise to doses to body tissues for many months or years after the intake. The need to regulate exposures to radionuclides and the accumulation of radiation dose over extended periods of time has led to the definition of committed dose quantities".

Equivalent dose V dose equivalent
There is no confusion between equivalent dose and dose equivalent. Indeed, they are same concepts. Although the CIPM definition states that the linear energy transfer function of the ICRU is used in calculating the biological effect, the ICRP in 1990  developed the "protection" dose quantities named effective and equivalent dose, which are calculated from more complex computational models and are distinguished by not having the phrase dose equivalent in their name.

Prior to 1990, the ICRP used the term "dose equivalent" to refer to the absorbed dose at a point multiplied by the quality factor at that point, where the quality factor was a function of linear energy transfer (LET). Currently, the ICRP's definition of "equivalent dose" represents an average dose over an organ or tissue, and radiation weighting factors are used instead of quality factors.

The phrase dose equivalent is only used for which use Q for calculation, and the following are defined as such by the ICRU and ICRP:

 ambient dose equivalent
 directional dose equivalent
 personal dose equivalent

In the US there are further differently named dose quantities which are not part of the ICRP system of quantities.

Use of old factors

The International Committee for Weights and Measures (CIPM) and the US Nuclear Regulatory Commission continue to use the old terminology of quality factors and dose equivalent. The NRC quality factors are independent of linear energy transfer, though not always equal to the ICRP radiation weighting factors. The NRC's definition of dose equivalent is "the product of the absorbed dose in tissue, quality factor, and all other necessary modifying factors at the location of interest." However, it is apparent from their definition of effective dose equivalent that "all other necessary modifying factors" excludes the tissue weighting factor.
The radiation weighting factors for neutrons are also different between US NRC and the ICRP - see accompanying diagram.

Dosimetry reports
Cumulative equivalent dose due to external whole-body exposure is normally reported to nuclear energy workers in regular dosimetry reports.

In the US, three different equivalent doses are typically reported: 
deep-dose equivalent, (DDE)
 shallow dose equivalent, (SDE)
 eye dose equivalent

See also
 Banana equivalent dose
 Becquerel
 Counts per minute
 Curie
 Gray (unit)
 Ionizing radiation units
Ionisation chamber
 Rad (unit)
 Roentgen (unit)
 Roentgen equivalent man
 Sievert

References

External links
Dose equivalent - glossary of the European Nuclear Society
  - "The confusing world of radiation dosimetry" - M.A. Boyd, U.S. Environmental Protection Agency. An account of chronological differences between USA and ICRP dosimetry systems.

Physical quantities
Radiobiology
Radiation protection